Flora, Nude is a sculpture by French artist Aristide Maillol.

Copies

Houston
A 1910 bronze sculpture is installed at the Museum of Fine Arts, Houston's Lillie and Hugh Roy Cullen Sculpture Garden, in the U.S. state of Texas. It was cast during 1960–1965 and gifted to the museum by Isaac Arnold, Jr. in honor of his wife, Antonette Tilly Arnold.

See also
 1910 in art
 List of public art in Houston

References

External links
 

1910 sculptures
Bronze sculptures in Michigan
Bronze sculptures in Texas
Lillie and Hugh Roy Cullen Sculpture Garden
Nude sculptures in Michigan
Nude sculptures in Texas
Sculptures by Aristide Maillol
Sculptures of the Detroit Institute of Arts
Sculptures of women in Michigan
Sculptures of women in Texas
Statues in Houston
Statues in Michigan
Works by French people